Zörnigall is a village and a former municipality in Wittenberg district in Saxony-Anhalt, Germany. Since 1 January 2011, it is part of the town Zahna-Elster. It belonged to the administrative municipality (Verwaltungsgemeinschaft) of Elbaue-Fläming.

Geography
Zörnigall lies about 8 km southeast of Lutherstadt Wittenberg.

Economy and transportation
Federal Highway (Bundesstraße) B 187 between Wittenberg and Jessen is about 1 km to the south.

References

Former municipalities in Saxony-Anhalt
Zahna-Elster